World Hip Hop Beats is a hip hop production group from Los Angeles, California which specializes in the creation of instrumental music for educational use. The group has released two studio albums and five singles.

Discography 
 Beats & Instrumentals, Vol. 1 (2012)
 Simulation Theory (2012)
 Twenty Two (2013)
 Kong (2013)
 Zombie (2014)
 Imagination (2014)
 Hendrix (2015)

References

External links
 World Hip Hop Beats Website

Hip hop collectives
Hip hop record producers
Musical groups established in 2012
2012 establishments in California